Pee Dee Creek is a stream in Marion and Shelby counties in the U.S. state of Missouri. It is a tributary to the South Fork of the North River.

Pee Dee Creek most likely derives its name from the Pee Dee River in the Carolinas.

See also
List of rivers of Missouri

References

Rivers of Marion County, Missouri
Rivers of Shelby County, Missouri
Rivers of Missouri